Winnipeg Rowing Club (WRC) is a rowing club on the Red River in downtown Winnipeg, Manitoba.

WRC provides adult and youth competitive rowing programs, and regularly sends crews to events like the Royal Canadian Henley Regatta, Western Canada Summer Games and Canada Games. WRC also offers recreational and independent rowing.

History 
The Winnipeg Rowing Club was founded in 1881 by cousins John Galt II and George Galt. The club was incorporated on 2 February 1883, with Premier John Norquay as Club Patron, Thomas Renwick as president, and George Galt as Club Captain.

Honours

Other sports 
WRC has a history of participation in non-rowing sports and has sent teams to
 Manitoba Rugby Football Union
 Manitoba Hockey Association
 Canadian Amateur Hockey League

Hockey
From 1902 to 1906, the Winnipeg Rowing Club had an ice hockey team in the Manitoba Hockey Association.  They were league champions in 1903 and 1904 and challenged the Ottawa Silver Seven for the Stanley Cup in 1904.  Players on the team that challenged for the Stanley Cup include William Breen and Hockey Hall of Famer Joe Hall.

1904 Stanley Cup Challenge

Roster
 Brown, Art - goal
 Browne, Percy E. - point
 Richards, S. Crawford - cover point
 William Breen - forward (captain)
 Joe Hall - forward
 Billy Bawlf - forward
 Claude Borland - forward
 Bennest, Clint - forward
 Harry Kirby - forward

After the first game of the series, Winnipeg added Eric Werge Hamber from the Toronto Argonauts ice hockey team.

References

External links
 Winnipeg Rowing Club website
 Eric Hamber

Rowing clubs in Canada
Sports teams in Winnipeg
Youth sport in Canada
Organizations based in Winnipeg
Boathouses
Defunct ice hockey teams in Canada
Ice hockey teams in Winnipeg
Sports clubs established in 1881
1881 establishments in Manitoba
Defunct ice hockey teams in Manitoba
Buildings and structures in downtown Winnipeg